Terry Ehret (born 1955 in San Francisco) is an American poet. She has published several collections of poetry including Suspensions, Lost Body, and Translations from the Human Language.

Life
She graduated from Stanford University in 1977, and from San Francisco State University in 1984, with an MA. She is the co-founder of Sixteen Rivers Press, a shared-work publishing collective for San Francisco Bay Area poets.

She served as poet laureate of Sonoma County, from 2004–2006, where she lives with her husband.

Awards
 1993 National Poetry Series
 1994 California Book Award, silver medal for poetry
 1995 Nimrod/Hardman Pablo Neruda Poetry Prize
 2008 Northern California Book Reviewers nomination for poetry

Work
 
 
 How We Go on Living (Protean Press, 1995)

Anthologies
 Orpheus and Company: Contemporary Poems on Greek Mythology (University of New England Press, 1996)

References

External links
"Author's website"
"Smoking With Terry Ehret", Smoke Long Quarterly
"SACRAMENTO POETRY CENTER—TERRY EHRET"

1955 births
Living people
Writers from San Francisco
Stanford University alumni
San Francisco State University alumni
American women poets
21st-century American women